Hew Dalrymple may refer to:

 Hew Dalrymple, Lord North Berwick (1652–1737), Scottish judge and politician
 Sir Hew Dalrymple, 2nd Baronet (1712–1790), Scottish politician, grandson of the above
 Hew Dalrymple (advocate) (c. 1740–1774), Scottish advocate, poet and Attorney-General of Grenada
 Sir Hew Dalrymple, 3rd Baronet (1746–1800), Scottish politician, son of the 2nd Baronet
 Hew Whitefoord Dalrymple (1750–1830), British Army general
 Hew Hamilton Dalrymple (1857–1945), Scottish politician